Michael Harty (born 7 April 1955) is a former Irish Independent politician who served as a Teachta Dála (TD) for the Clare constituency from 2016 to 2020.

Career

A general practitioner based in Kilmihil, County Clare, he campaigned on a 'No Doctor No Village' platform to reverse the decline in the income of rural GPs.

On the election of Taoiseach in 2016, he voted for Enda Kenny as Taoiseach. He served as Chair of the Committee on Health from April 2016 to February 2020.

On 13 January 2020, he announced that he would not contest the 2020 general election.

References

1952 births
Living people
Independent TDs
Members of the 32nd Dáil
People from County Clare
20th-century Irish medical doctors
21st-century Irish medical doctors